Pinnell is a surname. Notable people with the surname include:
Archibald Pinnell (1870–1948), Scottish footballer
Billy Pinnell (died 1977), British newspaper editor 
Gay Su Pinnell (born 1944), American educational theorist
Jeremy Pinnell, American country musician
Louise R. Pinnell (1877–1966), American lawyer
Matt Pinnell (born 1979), American politician
Owen Pinnell (born 1947), New Zealand bobsledder
Phillip Pinnell (born 1951), Australian footballer 
Sheldon Pinnell (died 2013), American dermatologist